Spiroceratidae is a family of extinct ammonites.

References

Ammonite families
Fossil taxa described in 1900
Ammonitida